Tudor Ioan Popa (born 7 July 1989) is a Romanian former professional footballer who played as a midfielder for Ceahlăul Piatra-Neamţ. Popa made his professional debut for Ceahlăul in a Liga I match against FC Rapid București in May 2007.

References

External links
 

1989 births
Living people
Romanian footballers
Association football midfielders
Liga I players
CSM Ceahlăul Piatra Neamț players